is a passenger railway station in the city of Yachiyo, Chiba, Japan, operated by the private railway operator Keisei Electric Railway.

Lines
Katsutadai Station is served by the Keisei Main Line, and is 40.3 km from the Tokyo terminus at Keisei-Ueno Station. The station is connected to Tōyō-Katsutadai Station on the Tōyō Rapid Railway.

Station layout
The station has two opposed side platforms connected by underpasses to the station building underneath.

Platforms

History
Katsutadai Station opened on 1 May 1968. An underground passage was built to Tōyō-Katsutadai Station in 1997.

Station numbering was introduced to all Keisei Line stations on 17 July 2010. Keisei-Ōwada Station was assigned station number KS31.

Passenger statistics
In fiscal 2019, the station was used by an average of 52,882 passengers daily.

Buses

The bus routes are operated by Keisei Bus、Chiba Nairiku Bus、Tōyō Bus (Chiba) and most bus routes are bound for apartment complex.

 Northern Exit

 Southern Exit

Surrounding area
 Tōyō-Katsutadai Station (Tōyō Rapid Railway Line)
 Yachiyo City Office
 Chiba Prefectural Yachiyo High School

See also
 List of railway stations in Japan

References

External links

 Station layout 

Railway stations in Chiba Prefecture
Keisei Main Line
Railway stations in Japan opened in 1968
Yachiyo, Chiba